Mi Corazón ("My Heart") is the second Spanish album recorded by American Latin pop and contemporary Christian singer Jaci Velasquez. It was released by Sony Music Latin on May 8, 2001. The album charted in the top 10 on both the Latin Pop Albums and Top Latin Albums charts. lead single, "Cómo Se Cura Una Herida", charted at No. 1 on the Billboard Hot Latin Tracks chart. The album received a nomination for a Grammy Award for Best Latin Pop Album in the 44th Annual Grammy Awards on February 27, 2002, and it won a Dove Award for Best Spanish language album of the year.

Track listing

Singles
 "Cómo Se Cura Una Herida" (a video was made for this song)
 "Déjame Quererte Para Siempre"
 "Dueño De Mi Corazon"

Personnel

 Jackie Aguirre - background vocals
 Pedro Alfonso - violin
 Susana Allen - translation, background vocals
 Carlos Álvarez - mixing
 Marcelo Añez - engineer
 Gustavo Arenas - arranger
 Kenny Aronoff - drums
 Jeff Bailey - horn
 Richard Bravo - assistant engineer, percussion
 Ed Calle - saxophone
 Jorge Casas - basic track
 Dorian Caster - photography
 Andrés Castillo - violin
 Gustavo Celis - engineer, mixing
 Desmond Child - producer
 Brian Coleman - assistant engineer, production coordination
 Mike Couzzi - mixing, mixing engineer
 Jeannie Cruz - background vocals
 Sal Cuevas - bass
 Fernando de Santiago - guitar, vihuela
 Charles Dye - mixing, mixing engineer
 Rob Eaton - engineer, mixing
 Vicky Echeverri - vocals, background vocals
 Geronimo Enríquez - horn arrangements
 Emilio Estefan, Jr. - producer
 Steve Fitzpatrick - hair stylist, make-up
 Alberto Gaitán - choir, chorus
 Ricardo Gaitán - arranger, choir, chorus, drum programming, keyboards, producer, programming
 Jules Gondar - engineer, producer
 Frank González - production coordination
 Jorge González - assistant engineer
 Roger González - assistant engineer

 Mike Haynes - horn
 Mark Heimermann - drum programming, keyboards, producer
 Julio Hernández - bass
 Alejandro Jaén - arranger, producer, background vocals
 Inez James - composer
 Ted Jensen - mastering
 Trevor Johnson - mixing
 Sebastian Krys - mixing engineer
 Gary Lindsay - vocal arrangement
 Óscar Llord - executive producer
 Álex López - art direction
 Ángel López - assistant producer
 Manuel López - arranger, engineer, guitar, producer, programming
 Craig Lozowick - engineer
 Steve MacMillan - mixing
 Judd Maher - conductor
 Nathan Malki - engineer
 Tony Mardini - assistant engineer, drum programming
 Lewis A. Martineé - arranger, assistant producer, engineer, keyboards, mixing, producer, programming
 Chris McDonald - horn
 Hugh McDonald - bass
 Lisette Mélendez - composer
 Miami Symphonic Orchestra - strings
 Raul Midón - choir, chorus, vocals
 Alfredo Oliva - concert comedian, concertina
 Abel Orta - bass, translation, background vocals
 Germán Ortíz - assistant engineer, engineer
 Mario Patiño - assistant coordinator
 Wendy Pederson - vocals
 Archie Peña - arranger, choir, chorus, cuatro, drum programming, guitar, percussion, producer, programming

 Buddy Pepper - composer
 Lena Pérez - choir, chorus, vocals
 Richie Pérez - engineer
 Rudy Pérez - arranger, direction, producer
 Clay Perry - keyboards, programming
 Rachel Perry - Choir, chorus, vocals
 Freddy Piñero, Jr. - arranger, engineer, mixing, producer, programming, vocal arrangement
 Leo Quintero - acoustic and electric guitar
 Asolfo Ramos - cello
 Jimmy Rey - background vocals
 Michael Ripoll - guitar
 Todd Robbins - engineer
 Abel Romero - violin
 Jorge Ruiz - arranger, direction
 Bert Russell - composer
 Larry Russell - composer
 Marco Antonio Santiago - guitar
 Jon Secada - arranger, programming, vocal arrangement
 Javier Solís - percussion, translation
 Ricardo Suárez - bass, vocals
 Ramiro Teran - choir, chorus, vocals
 Ken Theis - assistant engineer
 Felipe Tichauer - engineer
 Jaci Velasquez - liner notes, vocals, background vocals
 José Miguel Velásquez - arranger, choir, chorus, producer, programming, vocals
 Dan Warner - acoustic and electric guitar
 Bruce Weeden - engineer, mixing, mixing engineer

Charts

Weekly charts

Sales and certifications

References

2001 albums
Jaci Velasquez albums
Spanish-language albums
Sony Discos albums
Albums produced by Emilio Estefan
Albums produced by Rudy Pérez
Albums produced by Desmond Child